Stepania  may refer to:

 Stepania (given name), a feminine given name of Greek origin
 Vladimir Stepania (born 1976), Georgian basketball player

See also

 Stefania (disambiguation)
 Stephania (disambiguation)